Aneta may refer to:

Aneta (given name)
Aneta, North Dakota, US
Aneta (album), by Irini Merkouri
Aneta (news agency), the first news agency operating in the Dutch East Indies
Persbiro Indonesia Aneta, successor to the Aneta news agency